Dakota Davidson (born 31 December 1998) is an Australian rules footballer playing for Brisbane in the AFL Women's competition (AFLW).

Early life
Davidson was born in Ipswich, Queensland to a family of Indigenous Australian descent (Gunditjmara). Dakota attended Ipswich Girls' Grammar School throughout her upbringing. She began playing Australian rules at the age of 18 encouraged by her father who was familiar with the sport having moved from western Victoria at a young age. The club Dakota first played for was University of Queensland in the AFL Queensland Women's League. After 3 season in the league Dakota was identified as a talented forward/ruck by the Brisbane Lions having kicked 11 goals in 11 games and was selected to play in 2 games in the AFL Queensland QW Winter Series prior in the run up to the national draft.

AFLW career
Davidson made her debut in the Lions' round 1 game against  at Hickey Park on 8 February 2020. She starred in the Lions' 2021 preliminary final win over Collingwood with a three-goal performance to help her team qualify for the 2021 AFL Women's Grand Final.

Statistics
Statistics are correct to the end of the 2021 season.

|- style=background:#EAEAEA
| scope=row | 2020 ||  || 14
| 6 || 2 || 3 || 27 || 7 || 34 || 11 || 13 || 0.3 || 0.5 || 4.5 || 1.2 || 5.7 || 1.8 || 2.2 || 0
|-
| scope=row bgcolor=F0E68C | 2021# ||  || 14
| 11 || bgcolor=FFBBFF | 16‡ || 5 || 69 || 14 || 83 || 32 || 27 || 1.5 || 0.5 || 6.3 || 1.3 || 7.5 || 2.9 || 2.5 || 
|- class=sortbottom
! colspan=3 | Career
! 17 !! 18 !! 8 !! 96 !! 21 !! 117 !! 43 !! 40 !! 1.1 !! 0.5 !! 5.6 !! 1.2 !! 6.9 !! 2.5 !! 2.4 !! 0
|}

References

External links
 

1998 births
Living people
Sportspeople from Ipswich, Queensland
Sportswomen from Queensland
Australian rules footballers from Queensland
Brisbane Lions (AFLW) players
Indigenous Australian players of Australian rules football